David MacDonald may refer to:

David MacDonald (British politician) (1857–1919), Conservative MP for Bothwell
David MacDonald (director) (1904–1983), Scottish film director
David R. Macdonald (born 1930), U.S. Under Secretary of the Navy
David MacDonald (Canadian politician) (born 1936), Canadian minister and politician
Dave MacDonald (1936–1964), American sports car driver
David Macdonald (accountant) (born 1942), New Zealand accountant who served as auditor-general between 1994 and 2001
David Macdonald (biologist) (born 1951), British zoologist
David Bruce MacDonald, political scientist
D. R. MacDonald (born 1939), pen-name, American-Canadian author, lives Cape Breton Island
David Ross Macdonald, guitarist, drummer and singer/songwriter
David Robertson MacDonald (1764–1845), British army officer
Robert David MacDonald (1929–2004), playwright and director, known as David

See also
David McDonald (disambiguation)